Puerto Miranda is an oil port situated on the east side of Lake Maracaibo in Venezuela opposite the city of Maracaibo and is operated by the Venezuelan State Oil Company (PDVSA PETROLEO, S.A.) It is the largest crude oil export port in South America.

History
Shell, together with the Esso and Gulf subsidiaries  Creole and Mene Grande, decided to construct a deepwater port inside Lake Maracaibo from which to export their crude oils, together with a tank farm to store crude oils that were later sent to the refineries in Amuay and Cardon on the Paraguaná peninsula.
Construction of the port started at the end of the 1950s and was completed in 1961.

Facilities
Puerto Miranda has two jetties, each long enough to take two tankers, so that four tankers can be serviced at one time. 
Jetty No. 2 (North) provides two berths, Berth No. 1 and No. 2; Jetty No. 3 (South) provides Berths No. 5 and 6.
All cargo is loaded through  chiksans at a maximum rate of about 5,500 Tonnes per hour.
Products supplied are 
 Fuel Oil No. 2 and No. 6
and the following crude oils:
 Laguna
 Tia Juana Heavy
 Bachaquero
 Lagunillas
 Cabimas
 Menemota
 Lagomar
 Lagocinco
 Lagotreco

For a list of crude oil types see the List of crude oil products

Berth Restrictions

The maximum sailing draft for navigating the main lake channel is 11.53 metres.

References

Ports and harbours of Venezuela